David Vlugh (presumed to be born at Enkhuizen, 1611 – Schooneveld, 7 June 1673) was a 17th-century Dutch schout-bij-nacht.

1611 births
1673 deaths
Dutch naval personnel of the Anglo-Dutch Wars
People from Enkhuizen